Larry J. Miller (born March 11, 1954) is an American politician and a Democratic member of the Tennessee House of Representatives representing District 88 since January 1995.

Education
Miller earned his BA in social science from LeMoyne–Owen College.

Elections
2012 Miller was unopposed for the August 2, 2012 Democratic Primary, winning with 3,820 votes, and won the November 6, 2012 General election with 15,816 votes (75.3%) against Republican nominee Harry Barber.
1994 Miller was initially elected in the 1994 Democratic Primary and November 8, 1994 General election.
1996 Miller was challenged in the three-way 1996 Democratic Primary, but won, and was unopposed for the November 5, 1996 General election.
1998 Miller was unopposed for both the August 6, 1998 Democratic Primary, winning with 2,388 votes, and the November 3, 1998 General election, winning with 3,787 votes.
2000 Miller was unopposed for both the August 3, 2000 Democratic Primary, winning with 1,523 votes, and the November 7, 2000 General election, winning with 7,374 votes.
2002 Miller was unopposed for both the August 1, 2002 Democratic Primary, winning with 4,694 votes, and the November 5, 2002 General election, winning with 7,903 votes.
2004 Miller was unopposed for both the August 5, 2004 Democratic Primary, winning with 1,767 votes, and the November 2, 2004 General election, winning with 13,439 votes.
2006 Miller was unopposed for both the August 3, 2006 Democratic Primary, winning with 4,304 votes, and the November 7, 2006 General election, winning with 10,081 votes.
2008 Miller was unopposed for the August 7, 2008 Democratic Primary, winning with 2,882 votes, and won the November 4, 2008 General election with 14,051 votes (84.2%) against Independent candidate David Vinciarelli.
2010 Miller was unopposed for the August 5, 2010 Democratic Primary, and was unopposed for the November 2, 2010 General election, winning with 7,109 votes.

References

External links
Official page at the Tennessee General Assembly

Larry Miller at Ballotpedia
Larry Miller at the National Institute on Money in State Politics

1954 births
Living people
African-American state legislators in Tennessee
American firefighters
LeMoyne–Owen College alumni
Democratic Party members of the Tennessee House of Representatives
Politicians from Memphis, Tennessee
21st-century American politicians
21st-century African-American politicians
20th-century African-American people